Live II is a live album by the rock band Foghat. It was recorded in 2006 and released on 26 June 2007. It is Foghat's follow up to their 1977 album Foghat Live.

Track listing

Disc 1
Night Shift     
Take Me to the River   
Stone Blue    
Slippin' & Slidin'   
Drivin' Wheel   
Mumbo Jumbo     
Terraplane Blues   
Bang, Bang
Fool for the City

Disc 2
California Blues     
I Just Want to Make Love to You   
Chateau Lafitte '59 Boogie     
Slow Ride  
Trouble, Trouble     
Chevrolet    
I'm a Rock N' Roller   
I Feel Fine    
My Babe    
Self-Medicated     
Road Fever

Personnel
Roger Earl - drums
Craig MacGregor - bass
Bryan Bassett - guitar 
Charlie Huhn - vocals, guitar

References

Foghat albums
2007 live albums